Luigi Mariotti (23 November 1912 in Florence – 27 December 2004 in Florence) was an Italian politician.

Biography
 
Mariotti was a member of the Italian Socialist Party, with a reformist socialist tendency. He was Senator from 1953 to 1968 (Legislature II, III and IV), then he sat in the Chamber of Deputies from 1968 to 1979 (Legislature V, VI and VII).

He served as Minister of health four times, clashing with the Italian Liberal Party and part of the Christian Democracy, opposed or doubting about a universalistic approach to welfare, dear to the Socialist Party of those years and to Mariotti himself. He was the forerunner of the establishment of the National Health Service, which then took place in 1978, as a result of the battles that he promoted from the end of the '60s, within the centre-left governments. In 1968 he promoted the so-called Mariotti law (law 12 February 1968, no. 132), containing provisions on hospitals and hospital assistance, with which the hospital sector was profoundly reformed through the transformation of hospitals into public bodies distinct from assistance agencies.

He also served as Minister of Transport and Civil Aviation in the first Rumor government.

References

1912 births
2004 deaths
Politicians from Florence
Italian Socialist Party politicians
Italian Ministers of Health
Senators of Legislature II of Italy
Senators of Legislature III of Italy
Senators of Legislature IV of Italy
Deputies of Legislature V of Italy
Deputies of Legislature VI of Italy
Deputies of Legislature VII of Italy